Hypocalymma strictum is a species of shrub in the myrtle family Myrtaceae, endemic to the south west  of Western Australia.
 
It grows to between 0.2 and 1.5 metres in height and produces pink or white flowers between August and May in its native range.

The species was first formally described by botanist Johannes Conrad Schauer in Plantae Preissianae in 1844.

References

strictum
Endemic flora of Western Australia
Rosids of Western Australia